State Road 331 (SR 331) is a state highway in the north-central part of the U.S. state of Indiana.

Route description
State Road 331 runs from State Road 25 north of Rochester via Bourbon, Bremen and Mishawaka to State Road 23 just north of the Indiana Toll Road (Interstate 80/Interstate 90). The SR 331 designation northward from the St. Joseph Valley Parkway (US 20) is prescribed by state law, as are the locations of the intersections within this section.

History

SR 331 first appeared on the February 1933 edition of the Indiana State Highway Commission map of the state highway system, running from SR 25 in the south to SR 2 (later US 33 then SR 933) in the north. By 1953 it had been extended northward to US 20 (later Business US 20). Between 1980 and 1987 SR 331 was routed east of downtown Mishawaka. In June 1999 it was relocated eastward north of the St. Joseph Valley Parkway (US 20) in anticipation of a highway upgrade there which had been completed in part. Although by law the entire project was to have been completed by January 1, 2009, in reality it was finished by September 30, 2013. Subsequently in August 2014 the Indiana Department of Transportation relinquished the parallel portions of the route which it had acquired in 1999.

Major intersections

References

External links

 Routes in South Bend and Metro Northern Indiana - Includes a timeline of construction of Capital Avenue.

331
Transportation in Marshall County, Indiana
Transportation in St. Joseph County, Indiana